is a passenger railway station  located in the town of Yazu, Yazu District, Tottori Prefecture, Japan. It is operated by the third sector company Wakasa Railway.

Lines
Only local trains stop at this station.

Station layout
The station consists of two ground-level opposed side platforms connected to the wooden station building by a level crossing. This station building was built in 1930 and was registered as Tangible Cultural Property in 2008.

Adjacent stations

|-
!colspan=5|Wakasa Railway

History
Hattō Station opened on December 1, 1930.

Passenger statistics
In fiscal 2018, the station was used by an average of 60 passengers daily.

Surrounding area
Yazu Town Hatto Elementary School
Japan National Route 29
Japan National Route 482

See also
List of railway stations in Japan

References

External links 

Railway stations in Tottori Prefecture
Railway stations in Japan opened in 1930
Yazu, Tottori
Registered Tangible Cultural Properties